Mühbrook is a municipality in the district of Rendsburg-Eckernförde, in Schleswig-Holstein, Germany. The village is located at the Einfelder See between Neumünster and Bordesholm.

The 5.3 square kilometer large municipal area reaches to the Bordesholmer See in the north and includes the village Hohenhorst.

References

Municipalities in Schleswig-Holstein
Rendsburg-Eckernförde